Dobovjani is a village in the municipality of Struga, North Macedonia.

Demographics
According to the 2002 census, the village had a total of 168 inhabitants. Ethnic groups in the village include:

Albanians 164
Others 4

References

External links

Villages in Struga Municipality
Albanian communities in North Macedonia